Robert Henry Hotchkiss (December 24, 1818 – September 29, 1878) was a businessman and politician.  He was a member of the Wisconsin State Senate for 3 years, and a member of the Wisconsin State Assembly for one year.

Biography
Hotchkiss was born on December 24, 1818, Christmas Eve, in Smithfield, New York. On July 3, 1851 Hotchkiss married Jenette Bartholf. They had two children. He died on September 29, 1878. Hotchkiss was in the printing business and settled in Sheboygan County, Wisconsin. He died at his son-in-law's home in New York City.

Career
Hotchkiss was a member of the Assembly in 1857 and of the Senate from 1859 to 1860 and again in 1868. He was a Democrat.

References

People from Smithfield, New York
People from Sheboygan County, Wisconsin
Democratic Party Wisconsin state senators
Democratic Party members of the Wisconsin State Assembly
1818 births
1878 deaths
19th-century American politicians